Morchella pulchella is a species of fungus in the family Morchellaceae that was described as new to science in 2012. It is found in France, where it grows on calcareous soil under Buddleja davidii.

References

External links

pulchella
Edible fungi
Fungi described in 2012
Fungi of Europe